The Cornet is a 1955 West German historical film war film directed by Walter Reisch and starring Götz von Langheim, Anita Björk and Wolfgang Preiss.

Set during the Great Turkish War, the film is related to the 1912 poem The Love and Death of Cornet Christopher Rilke by Rainer Maria Rilke. It was shot in Eastmancolor. Location filming took place in Würzburg in Bavaria. The film's sets were designed by the art director Wolf Englert.

Cast
 Götz von Langheim as Cornet Christoph von Rilke
 Anita Björk as Gräfin von Zathmar
 Wolfgang Preiss as Freiherr von Pirovano
 Peter van Eyck as Mönchschreiber
 Benno Sterzenbach as Rittmeister Reningen
 Walter Janssen as Arzt
 Claus Clausen as General Graf Spork
 Piet Clausen as Adjutant Spork
 Fritz Rasp as Großwesir
 Eduard Köck as Falkenier
 Karl Friedrich Feudell as Kurier
 Emmy Erb as Obermagd
 Hanne-Lore Morell as Edeldame
 Almut Rothweiler as Edeldame
 Ruth Fischer as Zigeunerin
  as Der Deutsche
 Hans-Joachim Post as Der Spucker
 Gisela Free as Magd
 Fritz Friedrichs as Pfarrer
 Willi Hanning as Amtmann
 Friedrich Koch as Richter
 Heinz Püschel as Türkischer Feldwebel
 Walter Clemens as Marquis
 Rolf Kutschera
 Klaus Miedel
 Wolfgang Schmidt-Kessler

References

Bibliography 
 Davidson, John & Hake, Sabine. Framing the Fifties: Cinema in a Divided Germany. Berghahn Books, 2007.

External links 
 

1955 films
1950s historical films
1955 war films
German war films
German historical films
West German films
1950s German-language films
Films directed by Walter Reisch
Films set in the 1660s
Rainer Maria Rilke
Films shot in Bavaria
Films based on poems
1950s German films